Chaugan Stadium is a stadium in Jaipur city in Rajasthan state in India. Elephant polo matches are played here. The stadium is a venue of Teej festivities and Elephant Festival. The stadium lies between Gangauri Bazaar and the City Palace not far away from Govind Dev Ji Temple.

References 
Jaipur, profile of a changing city by Ramesh Kumar Arora, Rakesh Hooja, Shashi Mathur

Cricket grounds in Rajasthan
Sports venues in Jaipur
Elephant festivals
Year of establishment missing